The PX Index (until March 2006 the PX 50) is a capitalization-weighted index of major stocks that trade on the Prague Stock Exchange. Selected as the starting exchange day (a benchmark date) for the Index PX 50 was 5 April 1994 and its opening value was fixed at 1,000 points. At this time the index included 50 companies traded on the Prague Stock Exchange, accordingly named PX 50.

In 2014 Prague Stock Exchange introduced total return index PX-TR, that share same base as PX Index, but unlike PX index take into account dividends.

History

PX-50 
After an initial boom encouraged by voucher privatization (the top was in February 1994 retroactively calculated on 1245 points) the index started to decline fast, and ended the year 1994 with 557 points. In 1995 the decline continued (influenced by the Mexican crisis, that discouraged foreign investors from emerging markets) and the index reached its first bottom on 29 June with 387 points. Then the index increased slowly and ended the year 1995 with 426 points. The slow increase continued in 1996 and the index reached its second top on 25 February 1997 with 629 points. In 1998 influenced by 1998 Russian financial crisis the index reached its historical bottom on 8 October with 316 points. In 1999 the index emerged back to 500 points. With the help of the dot-com bubble and starting banks privatization, the index reached its second top on 24 March 2000 with 691 points. With the end of dot-com bubble and the IPB Bank crisis, the index declined back to 500 points. In 2001, the index slightly decreased and with the help of the influence of the September 11, 2001 attacks reached bottom on 17 September with 320 points. In 2002, the index slowly increased back to 500 points. In 2003 the index was rising, and ended the year with 659 points. With the help of the Czech Republic European Union accession, the index continued rising in 2004. It reached 1000 points on 19 November and ended the year with 1032 points. The index continued rising in 2005 and ended the year with 1473 points.

PX index 
On 20 March 2006 the PN 50 index was merged with PX-D into the PX index. The index reached bottom on 13 June with 1167 points after legislative elections, but ended the year with 1589 points. On 29 October 2007 it reached its top with 1936 points and ended the year with 1815 points. As result of financial crisis reached 700 points on 27 October 2008, losing 50% of its value in two months, second financial crisis based bottom was reached on 18 February 2009 with 629 points. 

! 1994 || 1995 || 1996 || 1997 || 1998 || 1999 || 2000 || 2001 || 2002 || 2003 || 2004 || 2005 || 2006 || 2007 || 2008 || 2009 || 2010 || 2011 || 2012 || 2013 || 2014 || 2015 || 2016  || 2017 || 2018 || 2019 || 2020
|-
| 1,245 || 587 || 582 || 629 || 517 || 526 || 691 || 515 || 479 || 659 || 1,032 || 1,478 || 1,626 || 1,936 || 1,808 || 1,195 || 1,315 || 1,275 || 1,041 || 1,066 || 1,046 || 1,058 || 954 || 1,087 || 1,140 || 1,119 || 1,142
|-
| 541 || 387 || 438 || 459 || 316 || 333 || 410 || 320 || 388 || 460 || 662 || 1,051 || 1,167 || 1,565 || 700 || 629 || 1093 || 843 || 859 || 853 || 901 || 846 || 819 || 919 || 978 || 989 || 690

PX Index base
The components as of March 2020 are sorted by reduced market capitalization:
 ERSTE BANK (ISIN: AT0000652011)
 ČEZ (ISIN: CZ0005112300)
 KOMERČNÍ BANKA (ISIN: CZ0008019106)
  (ISIN: CZ0008040318) - since 2016
 VIG (ISIN: AT0000908504)
 AVAST (ISIN: GB00BDD85M81) - since 2018
  (ISIN: CS0008418869)
 STOCK (ISIN: GB00BF5SDZ96)
  (ISIN: LU0275164910)
  (ISIN: CZ0009000121)

Past
 O2 C.R. (ISIN: CZ0009093209) - removed in 2022
 CETV (ISIN: BMG200452024) - removed in 2020
 UNIPETROL (ISIN: CZ0009091500) - removed in 2018
  (ISIN: CZ0005124420) - removed in 2016
 NWR (ISIN: GB00B42CTW68) - removed in 2016
 ORCO (ISIN: LU0122624777) - removed in 2014
 TMR (ISIN: SK1120010287) - removed in 2014
  (ISIN: NL0006033375) - removed in 2013
 KITD (ISIN: US4824702009) - removed in 2012
 ECM (ISIN: LU0259919230) - removed in 2011
 ZENTIVA (ISIN: NL0000405173) - removed in 2009

PX-TR 
In March 2014 Prague Stock Exchange introduced new total return index PX-TR. The index shares same base as PX index, but unlike PX index take into account dividends. As the starting exchange day (a benchmark date) was selected 20 March 2006, when PX-50 and PX-D were merged. Main aim of creation of PX-TR index was to promote above average dividend yield of Prague Stock Exchange.

References

External links
Prague Stock Exchange - Exchange Indices
Bloomberg page for PX:IND

European stock market indices
Economy of the Czech Republic